Sir Charles Edward Beck Bowman  (born 1961) is a British accountant who served as the 690th Lord Mayor of London.

Career 
Bowman was born in Essex and educated at Old Buckenham Hall School from 1970 to 1975 and Uppingham School from 1975 to 1979. He gained a degree in architecture from the University of Bristol.

Bowman joined Price Waterhouse in 1983 and qualified as a chartered accountant in 1986. He was a partner in Price Waterhouse and PwC from 1995 to 2020 and has been an adviser to the firm since then.

He specialised in delivering audit, assurance and capital market transaction services to larger listed and multi-national companies. Amongst many leadership roles in PwC, Charles led the firm’s Building Public Trust programme.

Outside of PwC, he has chaired the Assurance Panel and the Audit and Assurance Faculty of the Institute of Chartered Accountants in England & Wales ICAEW and was a member of its governing body. He chaired the Audit Quality Forum. Charles has also served as a member of the Advisory Council of the Prince of Wales’s Accounting for Sustainability Project, a member of the Board of Trade, a JP, governor of a primary school academy in Hackney, board member of a School Foundation, Ambassador to the Samaritans, Trustee and Chairman of The Lord Mayor’s Appeal and an Adviser to The Mansion House Scholarship Scheme. He is a member of the Trade Advisory Group for Professional Advisory Services a board member of the China-Britain Business Council, RedCat Pub Company and The Nurture Landscapes Group, and Honorary Air Commodore of No. 2623 Squadron RAuxAF Regiment.

Bowman is a member of the Court of the Worshipful Company of Grocers and a liveryman of the Worshipful Company of Chartered Accountants in England and Wales.

He was knighted in the 2019 Birthday Honours for services to trust in business, international trade and the City of London.

City of London 
He was elected as an Alderman of the city of London corporation – where he represents the Lime Street Ward – in May 2013. He served as one of the two Sheriffs of the City of London in 2015/16 and as Lord Mayor of London in 2017/18.
As Lord Mayor, Charles launched the City of London corporation's Business of Trust programme with its aims of helping to create "a lasting legacy of better business, trusted by society".

Personal life 
Charles is married to Samantha, a veterinary surgeon. They have two daughters, Grace and Charlotte and live in Suffolk although he has spent the working week in London. Other interests include golf, tennis, art and architecture and country matters – including helping, when allowed, to co-shepherd a small flock of sheep.

References 

 

1961 births
Living people
People educated at Uppingham School
Alumni of the University of Bristol
Knights Bachelor
British accountants
21st-century lord mayors of London
21st-century English politicians